John Orr (born 1995), is a Scottish bowls player who won the World Under-25 title at the 2019 World Indoor Bowls Championship and is a Scottish Junior international.

He attended Calderglen High School and grew up in St Leonards, East Kilbride.

References

Scottish male bowls players
1995 births
Living people